William Robert Wright (May 20, 1935 – January 13, 2012) was an American attorney, political candidate, and author.

Early life and education
Wright was born in Salt Lake City, Utah, to Ralph Bassett Wright and Afton Middlemiss Wright. He graduated from East High School in 1953, and then served in the Swiss Austrian Mission of the LDS Church from 1955 to 1958. Returning home to the University of Utah, he was elected student body vice president and received a Bachelor of Science in Geology in 1960, and a J.D. in 1963.

Career
Wright worked at the firm Jones, Waldo, Holbrook & McDonough in Salt Lake City for 29 years.. He later become a partner at Arent Fox in Washington, D.C., and then at Bryan Cave in Salt Lake City.

From 1977 to 1979, Wright was Chairman of the Utah Republican Party. He ran unsuccessfully as the GOP's candidate for Utah governor in the 1980 gubernatorial election against Scott M. Matheson. He was considered for President Ronald Reagan's judicial nomination to the United States Court of Appeals for the Tenth Circuit.

From 1989 to 1992, Wright served in the LDS Church as president of the Washington D.C. North Mission. There, he met Gregory Prince, a pathology researcher, and they began a ten-year collaboration to produce a biography of David O. McKay. The book drew from the Middlemiss papers and interviews conducted by Wright and Prince, and was published in 2005 as David O. McKay and the Rise of Modern Mormonism, winning multiple awards.

After retiring from full time legal work, Wright practiced law independently in Salt Lake City and Washington, D.C. He also served as chairman of the University of Utah's Institutional Council and as chairman of the Utah State School Board. Wright was also a lecturer and Fellow of the S.J. Quinney College of Law and held leadership positions with the Utah State Bar.

Personal life
Wright married Janet Clark in the Salt Lake Temple in 1965. They lived in Salt Lake City and had one daughter and seven sons, including Thomas Wright, a real estate broker and one-time Chairman of the Utah Republican Party.

Wright died on January 13, 2012, after a 20-year struggle with Alzheimer's disease.

Notes

Citations

1935 births
2012 deaths
20th-century Mormon missionaries
American biographers
American Latter Day Saint writers
American leaders of the Church of Jesus Christ of Latter-day Saints
American Mormon missionaries in Switzerland
American Mormon missionaries in the United States
Neurological disease deaths in Utah
Deaths from Alzheimer's disease
Historians of the Latter Day Saint movement
Mission presidents (LDS Church)
Politicians from Salt Lake City
University of Utah people
Utah lawyers
Utah Republicans
Writers from Utah
Latter Day Saints from Utah
20th-century American lawyers